The Svetislav Stančić International Piano Competition  takes place every four years (next, 5th edition in 2015) in Zagreb (Croatia.  It is organized by the Croatian branch of the European Piano Teachers Association (EPTA Croatia) and Zagreb Concert Management. It is named after Svetislav Stančić. The first competition was held in 1999 and it takes place in the Vatroslav Lisinski Concert Hall in Zagreb.

The judges have included Dmitri Bashkirov, Sulamita Aronovsky, Rudolf Kehrer, Jean-François Antonioli, Jerome Rose, Radomir Melmuka, Vladimir Krpan, Julian Jacobson, Eliso Virsaladze and others.

Prize Winners

External links 

 
 Directory of International Piano Competitions - Croatia

Piano competitions
Culture in Zagreb
Quadrennial events
Recurring events established in 1999
1999 establishments in Croatia
Music events in Croatia